Sir Nigel Leonard Wicks  (born 16 June 1940) is a British financier and former senior British civil servant. He also served as Chairman of Euroclear.

Career 
Educated originally at Beckenham and Penge Grammar School, Wicks joined British Petroleum in 1958 at the age of 18. Whilst at BP, Wicks studied for a University of London external MA in business administration at the Portsmouth College of Technology, now part of the University of Portsmouth.

After 10 years at BP, Wicks joined HM Treasury in 1968. At the Treasury, Wicks undertook a number of positions including secondments to the Prime Minister's Office as a Private Secretary to the Prime Minister (1975–1978, under Callaghan and Wilson) and at the British Embassy in Washington, D.C. as Economic Minister (and so the UK's Executive Director of the IMF and IBRD) from 1983–1985.

In 1985, Wicks took up his position as Principal Private Secretary to the Prime Minister, Margaret Thatcher, a post he held for three years until returning to the Treasury as Second Permanent Secretary with responsibility for International Finance, where he remained for twelve years until reaching mandatory retirement age in 2000. After Wicks' retirement, the Treasury's International Finance command was merged into that of Macro-Economic Policy, led by Gus O'Donnell (later The Lord O'Donnell).

After retirement, Wicks moved into finance; he served as Chairman of CRESTCo for a year from 2001 until it merged with Euroclear, where he was Deputy chairman 2002–2006 and since then as chairman. Wicks also served as a non-executive director of Morgan Stanley for three years from 2004, and of The Edinburgh Investment Trust since 2005.

In public appointments, Wicks was appointed Chairman of the Committee on Standards in Public Life from 2001–2004, as Chair of the panel appointing the initial members of the then-new Judicial Appointments Commission in 2005, and since 2007 has been Commissioner of the Jersey Financial Services Commission.

In October 2012, Wicks was appointed chairman of the British Bankers' Association.

Personal life 

As well as his MA degree from the University of London, Wicks holds an MA degree from the University of Cambridge, and honorary LLD degrees from the Universities of Bath and Portsmouth. He is married with three sons.

Wicks was appointed a Commander of the Order of the British Empire (CBE) in Prime Minister Callaghan's Resignation Honours list in 1979, a Commander of the Royal Victorian Order (CVO) in the 1989 New Year Honours, and a Knight Commander (KCB) in the 1992 New Year Honours, and then promoted to a Knight Grand Cross of the Order of the Bath (GCB) in the 1999 New Year Honours.

References

Positions held 

Living people
1940 births
Civil servants in HM Treasury
British businesspeople
Principal Private Secretaries to the Prime Minister
Knights Grand Cross of the Order of the Bath
Commanders of the Royal Victorian Order
Commanders of the Order of the British Empire
Member of the Committee on Standards in Public Life